This is a list of events in Scottish television during 1962.

Events

14 March – tenth anniversary of the first broadcast of the BBC One Scotland.
16 August – the BBC airs the original series of Dr. Finlay's Casebook.
Unknown – The Beatles make their first appearance on STV.

Debuts

BBC
16 August – Dr. Finlay's Casebook (1962–1971)

ITV
Unknown – The Adventures of Francie and Josie (1962–1970)

Television series
Scotsport (1957–2008)
The White Heather Club (1958–1968)

Births
23 April – John Hannah, actor
23 April – Elaine Smith, actress
17 May – Craig Ferguson, television presenter
31 July – Jackie Bird, journalist and newsreader
25 November – Blythe Duff, actress
28 December – Kaye Adams, television presenter
Unknown – Jack Docherty, comedian

See also
1962 in Scotland

References

 
Television in Scotland by year
1960s in Scottish television